Burns Lake Park is a provincial park in British Columbia, Canada, located near the town of Burns Lake.

External links
 

Provincial parks of British Columbia
Nechako Country
2001 establishments in British Columbia